Beaufoy Ridge is a conspicuous black ridge, rising to  at its northwest end, standing at the west side of Sunshine Glacier and close north of Iceberg Bay on the south coast of Coronation Island, in the South Orkney Islands.

References 

Coronation Island
Ridges of the South Orkney Islands